Pa Tang may refer to:
Pa Tang, a village in Sesant Commune, Ou Ya Dav District, Cambodia
Pa Tang (commune), a commune in Lumphat District, Cambodia
Pa Tang, Iran